The Indian cricket team toured Sri Lanka from 23 July to 29 August.

Squads

Test Series

1st Test

2nd Test

3rd Test

ODI series

1st ODI

2nd ODI

3rd ODI

4th ODI

5th ODI

References

2008 in Indian cricket
2008 in Sri Lankan cricket
2008
International cricket competitions in 2008
Sri Lankan cricket seasons from 2000–01